Rahmanberdi Alyhanow (19 January 1986 – 29 January 2014) was a Turkmen footballer, who played a goalkeeper for FC HTTU, Altyn Asyr FK and Turkmenistan national football team.

Club career
Alyahanow won the gold medal in the 2014 Ýokary Liga with Altyn Asyr FK, and was the second top scorer (26 goals).

Alyahanow died on 29 December 2014 after a failed operation in a clinic in Istanbul. The following day, he was buried in Turkmenistan.

References

External links

1986 births
2014 deaths
Turkmenistan international footballers
Footballers at the 2010 Asian Games
Turkmenistan footballers
Association football goalkeepers
Asian Games competitors for Turkmenistan